Chương Thị Kiều (born 19 August 1995) is a Vietnamese footballer who plays as a defender for Women's Championship club Hồ Chí Minh City I and the Vietnam women's national team.

International goals

References

1995 births
Living people
Women's association football defenders
Vietnamese women's footballers
Vietnam women's international footballers
Asian Games competitors for Vietnam
Footballers at the 2018 Asian Games
Southeast Asian Games gold medalists for Vietnam
Southeast Asian Games medalists in football
Competitors at the 2017 Southeast Asian Games
Southeast Asian Games silver medalists for Vietnam
Competitors at the 2013 Southeast Asian Games
21st-century Vietnamese women
Vietnamese people of Cambodian descent
Khmer Krom people